Fayette County is a county located in the U.S. state of Alabama. As of the 2020 census, the population was 16,321. Its county seat is Fayette. Its name is in honor of the Marquis de Lafayette (or de la Fayette), who aided General George Washington in the American Revolutionary War.

History
Fayette County was established on December 20, 1824, during Lafayette's historic tour of the 24 United States

Geography

Sheriffs Department
Sheriff-Byron Yerby

Adjacent counties
Marion County (north)
Walker County (east)
Tuscaloosa County (southeast)
Pickens County (southwest)
Lamar County (west)

Demographics

2020 census

As of the 2020 United States census, there were 16,321 people, 6,802 households, and 4,774 families residing in the county.

2010 census
As of the census of 2010, there were 17,241 people, 7,493 households, and 5,342 families residing in the county.  The population density was 30 people per square mile (11/km2).  There were 8,472 housing units at an average density of 14 per square mile (5/km2).  The racial makeup of the county was 86.92% White, 11.93% Black or African American, 0.21% Native American, 0.15% Asian, 0.01% Pacific Islander, 0.27% from other races, and 0.51% from two or more races.  0.82% of the population were Hispanic or Latino of any race.

As of 2012 the largest self-reported ancestry groups in Fayette County were:
44.9% English
16.9% "American"
4.1% Irish

There were 7,493 households, out of which 30.80% had children under the age of 18 living with them, 57.30% were married couples living together, 10.60% had a female householder with no husband present, and 28.70% were non-families. 26.60% of all households were made up of individuals, and 13.50% had someone living alone who was 65 years of age or older.  The average household size was 2.42 and the average family size was 2.92.

In the county, the population was spread out, with 22.30% under the age of 18, 8.20% from 18 to 24, 26.50% from 25 to 44, 25.30% from 45 to 64, and 17.90% who were 65 years of age or older.  The median age was 39 years. For every 100 females, there were 93.50 males.  For every 100 females age 18 and over, there were 89.60 males.

The median income for a household in the county was $28,539, and the median income for a family was $34,560. Males had a median income of $29,239 versus $20,606 for females. The per capita income for the county was $14,439.  About 13.10% of families and 17.90% of the population were below the poverty line, including 22.30% of those under age 18 and 17.90% of those age 65 or over.

Life expectancy
Of 3,143 counties in the United States in 2013, Fayette County ranked 2,882 in the longevity of male residents and 3,091 of female residents.  Males in Fayette County lived an average of 71.2 years and females lived an average of 75.3 years compared to the national average for longevity of 76.5 for males and 81.2 for females. The average longevity of men in Fayette County increased by 2.0 years from 1985 to 2013 compared to a national average for the same period of an increased life span for men of 5.5 years.  The average longevity, however, for females in Fayette County declined by 4.2 years between 1985 and 2013 compared to the national average for the same period of an increased life span of 3.1 years for women. High rates of smoking and obesity and a low rate of physical activity appear to be contributing factors to the low level of longevity for both sexes.

One study concluded that Fayette County between 1985 and 2010 was one of the few U.S. counties which saw a decline in the longevity of women and that the decline in female longevity in Fayette Country was the largest of any county in the nation.

Education
Berry High School
Berry Elementary School
Fayette County High School
Fayette Middle School
Fayette Elementary School
Hubbertville School

Transportation

Major highways
 U.S. Highway 43
 State Route 13
 State Route 18
 State Route 96
 State Route 102
 State Route 107
 State Route 129
 State Route 171
 State Route 233

Airport
Richard Arthur Field (Municipal)- A  paved runway with JET A and 100LL fuel service.

Rail
BNSF Railway
Norfolk Southern Railway
Luxapalila Valley Railroad

Government
Fayette County is reliably Republican at the presidential level. The last Democrat to win the county in a presidential election is Bill Clinton, who won it by a plurality in 1996.

Communities

Cities
Fayette (county seat)
Winfield (partly in Marion County)

Towns
Belk
Berry
Glen Allen (partly in Marion County)
Gu-Win (partly in Marion County)

Unincorporated communities
Bankston
Bazemore
Bluff
Boley Springs
Covin
Flatwoods
Howard
Hubbertville
Newtonville
Studdards Crossroads

See also
National Register of Historic Places listings in Fayette County, Alabama
Properties on the Alabama Register of Landmarks and Heritage in Fayette County, Alabama

References

External links
City of Fayette
Fayette County High School
Fayette County High School Marching Band

 

 
1824 establishments in Alabama
Populated places established in 1824
Counties of Appalachia